This is a list of Military Sealift Command ships. The fleet includes about 130 ships in eight programs: Fleet Oiler (PM1), Special Mission (PM2), Strategic Sealift (PM3), Tow, Salvage, Tender, and Hospital Ship (PM4), Sealift (PM5), Combat Logistics Force (PM6), Expeditionary Mobile Base, Amphibious Command Ship, and Cable Layer (PM7) and Expeditionary Fast Transport (PM8).

List of current Military Sealift Command ships

Previous MSC Ships

 
 
 
 
 
 
 
 
 USNS Assurance (T-AGOS-5)
 MV Atlantic Freighter
 USNS Audacious (T-AGOS-11)
 MV Baffin Strait (T-AK W9519)
 
 USNS Bellatrix (T-AKR-288)
 
 
 
 
 
 
 
 
 
 
 
 USNS Capella (T-AKR-293)
 
 
 
 
 
 
 USNS Denebola (T-AKR-289)
 
 SS Empire State (T-AP-1001)
 MT Evergreen State (T-AOT-5205)
 
 
 
 
 
 
 
 
 USNS Maury (T-AGS-39)
 
 
 
 
 
 
 
 
 
 USNS Regulus (T-AKR-292)
 
 
 
 
 
 
 HSV-2 Swift
 
 MV Westpac Express (HSV-4676) (charter with US Navy ended January 2018)

See also
 Strategic Sealift Ships
 National Defense Reserve Fleet
 Ready Reserve Force ships
 United States Maritime Administration
 United States Federal Maritime Commission
 Naval Inactive Ship Maintenance Facility

References

External links
Military Sealift Command Ship Inventory by Program
RRF Locations

Lists of ships of the United States
Auxiliary ships of the United States
Lists of auxiliary ships
United States Navy lists